The 1986 Oregon gubernatorial election took place on November 4, 1986. Democratic nominee Neil Goldschmidt defeated Republican Norma Paulus to win the election.

Candidates

Democratic
 Neil Goldschmidt, former United States Secretary of Transportation and former Mayor of Portland, Oregon
 Edward Fadeley, former President of the Oregon State Senate

Republican
 Norma Paulus, Oregon Secretary of State

Election results
The official results of the election were:

References

1986
Oregon
Gubernatorial